Haloechinothrix alba is a halophilic bacterium from the genus Haloechinothrix which has been isolated from soil from the Qijiaojing Lake in Xinjiang, China.

References

Halophiles
Pseudonocardiales
Bacteria described in 2010